Chintakunta Munuswamy Ramesh is an Indian politician from Bharatiya Janata Party and businessman.

He was a Public accounts committee member from BJP and also Member of Parliament (Rajya Sabha) from Andhra Pradesh. He won his second consecutive Rajya Sabha term in 2018.

C.M. Ramesh is the Founder Chairman of Rithwik Projects Pvt. Ltd., which was set up in 1999 and it has grown to a turnover of more than 1000 Crores within a span of 14 years. The company is one of the leading Infrastructure Developers in India and has interests in energy, roads, irrigation projects and property development.

Hunger strike 

C.M Ramesh started a hunger strike on 20 June 2018, demanding Steel Plant in Kadapa which was part of the Andhra Pradesh Reorganization Act 2014. Former Tamil Nadu Chief Minister Karunanidhi's daughter Kanimozhi visited fasting camp on 26 June and extended support for the cause from her DMK party thereby garnering nationwide support for Andhra Pradesh in achieving its rights.

See also

 Rajya Sabha members from Andhra Pradesh
 Rajya Sabha members from Telangana

References

Businesspeople from Andhra Pradesh
Telugu politicians
Telugu Desam Party politicians
Living people
Rajya Sabha members from Andhra Pradesh
Rajya Sabha members from Telangana
Year of birth missing (living people)
Bharatiya Janata Party politicians from Andhra Pradesh